Capernaum is a 2018 Lebanese drama film directed by Nadine Labaki and produced by Khaled Mouzanar. The screenplay was written by Labaki, Jihad Hojaily and Michelle Keserwany from a story by Labaki, Hojaily, Keserwany, Georges Khabbaz and Khaled Mouzanar. The film stars Syrian refugee child actor Zain Al Rafeea as Zain El Hajj, a 12-year-old living in the slums of Beirut. Capernaum is told in flashback format, focusing on Zain's life, including his encounter with an Ethiopian immigrant Rahil and her infant son Yonas, and leading up to his attempt to sue his parents for child neglect.

The film debuted at the 2018 Cannes Film Festival, where it was selected to compete for the Palme d'Or, and won the Jury Prize. Capernaum received a 15-minute standing ovation following its premiere at Cannes on 17 May 2018. Sony Pictures Classics, which had previously distributed Labaki's Where Do We Go Now?, bought North American and Latin American distribution rights for the film, while Wild Bunch retained the international rights. It received a wider release on 20 September 2018.

Capernaum received critical acclaim, with particular praise given to Labaki's direction, Al Rafeea's performance and the film's "documentary-like realism". Writing for The New York Times, Manohla Dargis and A. O. Scott named it as one of the greatest films of 2018. It was nominated for the Academy Award for Best Foreign Language Film at the 91st Academy Awards, among several other accolades.

Plot
Zain El Hajj, a 12-year-old from the slums of Beirut, is serving a five-year prison sentence in Roumieh Prison for stabbing someone whom he refers to as a "son of a bitch". Neither Zain nor his parents know his exact date of birth as they never applied/received an official birth certificate. Zain is brought before a court, having decided to take civil action against his parents, his mother, Souad, and his father, Selim. When asked by the judge why he wants to sue his parents, Zain answers "Because I was born" (or, more precisely, "because you had me"). Meanwhile, Lebanese authorities process a group of migrant workers, including a young Ethiopian woman named Rahil.

The story then flashes back several months to before Zain was arrested. Zain lives with his parents and takes care of at least seven younger siblings who make money in various schemes instead of going to school. He uses forged prescriptions to purchase tramadol pills from multiple pharmacies, which they crush into powder and soak them into clothes, which his brother sells to drug addicts in prison. Zain also works as a delivery boy for Assad, the family's landlord, and the owner of a local market stall. One morning, Zain helps his 11-year-old sister Sahar to hide the evidence of her first period, fearing she will be married to Assad if her parents discover that she can now become pregnant.

Zain makes plans to escape with Sahar and begin a new life. However, his suspicions are proven correct as her parents marry off Sahar to Assad in exchange for two chickens. Furious at his parents, Zain runs away and catches a bus, where he meets an elderly man dressed in a knock-off Spider-Man costume who calls himself "Cockroach Man". Cockroach Man gets off the bus at the Luna Park in Ras Beirut and Zain follows him, spending the rest of the day at the park. While on the ferris wheel, Zain sees a beautiful sunset and begins to cry. Later, Zain meets Rahil, an Ethiopian migrant worker who is working as a cleaner at the park. She takes pity on Zain and agrees to let him live with her at her tin shack in exchange for Zain babysitting her undocumented infant son Yonas when she is at work.

Rahil's forged migrant documents are due to expire soon and she does not have enough money to pay her forger Aspro for new documents. Aspro offers to forge the documents for free if she gives Yonas to him so that Yonas can be adopted. Rahil refuses, despite Aspro's claims that Yonas' undocumented status will mean he can never receive an education or be employed. Rahil's documents expire and she is arrested by Lebanese authorities. After she does not return to the shack, Zain panics. Several days pass, and Zain begins looking after Yonas on his own, claiming that they are brothers, and begins selling tramadol again to earn money.

One day, while at Souk Al Ahad, where Aspro is based, Zain meets a young girl named Maysoun. Maysoun is a Syrian refugee and claims that Aspro has agreed to send her to Sweden. Zain demands that Aspro send him to Sweden as well, which Aspro agrees to do if Zain gives him Yonas. Zain reluctantly agrees, and Aspro tells him that he will need some form of identification to become a refugee. Zain returns to his parents and demands they give him his identification, to which they laughingly tell him he doesn't have any. Having disowned him for leaving, they kick him out of their house, but not before revealing that Sahar had recently died due to difficulties with her pregnancy. Furious, Zain takes a large knife, runs out the house and stabs Assad. Zain is arrested and sentenced to five years at Roumieh Prison.

While in prison, during a visit from his mother, Zain learns that Souad is pregnant yet again and plans to name the child Sahar. Disgusted by his mother's lack of remorse for her daughter's death, he tells her not to visit again, calling her "heartless". During a TV show requesting call-in commentary on child abuse, Zain contacts the media and says that he is tired of parents neglecting their children and plans to sue his parents for continuing to have children when they cannot take care of them. When the judge asks him what he wants from his parents, he says "I want them to stop having children", as he does not want them to suffer the neglect he has. Zain also alleges that Aspro is adopting children illegally and mistreating them. Aspro's house is raided and the children and parents are reunited, including Yonas and Rahil.

Zain's photo is taken for his ID card. The photographer cracks a joke at Zain's sour disposition—"It's your ID card, not your death certificate"—and Zain manages a smile.

Cast

Zain Al Rafeea as Zain El Hajj, a 12-year-old boy living in the slums of Beirut
Yordanos Shiferaw as Rahil (also known as Tigest), an undocumented Ethiopian woman who works as a cleaner at an amusement park
Boluwatife Treasure Bankole (a girl) as Yonas, Rahil's undocumented son
Kawthar Al Haddad as Souad, Zain's mother
Fadi Kamel Youssef as Selim, Zain's father
Nour el Husseini as Assad, the owner of a local market and Sahar's husband
Alaa Chouchnieh as Aspro, Rahil's forger 
Cedra Izam as Sahar, Zain's sister
Nadine Labaki as Nadine, Zain's lawyer
Joseph Jimbazian as Mr. Harout (also known as Cockroach Man), an employee at an amusement park
Farah Hasno as Maysoun, a young Syrian refugee

Production
Screenwriter and director Nadine Labaki described the conception of the film:

Producer Khaled Mouzanar took out a mortgage on his house to raise a budget.

Zain Al Rafeea, a Syrian refugee living in the slums of Beirut since 2012, was 12 during production. Al Rafeea's character, Zain, is named for him. Many of the other actors were novices, which Labaki described as necessary because she wanted "a real struggle on that big screen". Al Rafeea contributed to shaping the film's dialogue, drawing on his experiences as a refugee living in a slum.

Although Labaki is also an actress, she gave herself only a small role, preferring the realist actors to draw from their own experiences. Shooting lasted six months and resulted in 500 hours of rushes, which took her and her editing team a year and a half to edit down to 2 hours. The first version of the film was 12 hours long, but working in sometimes 24-hour editing shifts with her editors, she was able to cut the film in time. She became very close to her editing team over this period and referred to them, and her crew, as her family.

Reception

Box office
It has become the highest-grossing Arabic film, and the highest-grossing Middle-Eastern film of all time, surpassing the  box office record of Labaki's earlier film Where Do We Go Now? (2012).

The film had a limited release in the United States and Canada on 14 December 2018. The film went on to gross $1,661,096 in the United States and Canada, . Outside of the United States and Canada, the film has grossed  in international markets, .

It released in China on 29 April 2019, and debuted at number two there, behind Avengers: Endgame. Capernaum became a sleeper hit in China, with the help of strong word-of-mouth on Chinese social media (including platforms such as Douban and TikTok). By 5 May 2019, Capernaum had grossed  in China, becoming the weekend's second top-grossing film internationally, behind only Avengers: Endgame. By 16 May 2019, the film had crossed  in China, in just over two weeks, becoming a surprise blockbuster at the Chinese box office. , the film has grossed $54,315,148 in China.

Critical response
The website's critics consensus reads, "Capernaum hits hard, but rewards viewers with a smart, compassionate, and ultimately stirring picture of lives in the balance." On Metacritic, the film has a weighted average score of 75 out of 100 based on reviews from 33 critics, indicating "generally favorable reviews".

Many reviews were highly positive. A. O. Scott of The New York Times ranked it as the ninth greatest film of 2018, writing "naturalism meets melodrama in this harrowing, hectic tale of a lost boy’s adventures in the slums and shantytowns of Beirut...Labaki refuses to lose sight of the exuberance, grit and humor that people hold onto even in moments of the greatest desperation." Varietys Jay Weissberg judged Capernaum to represent a substantial improvement in Labaki's direction, bringing "intelligence and heart" to its issue. The Hollywood Reporter critic Leslie Felperin called it an effective melodrama. On Vulture.com, Emily Yoshida called Zain Al Rafeea "a startling, unforgettable presence". Yoshida also interpreted it as "one of the most forcefully pro-choice films I've ever seen", though abortion is not mentioned.

Some reviews were more mixed. Writing for The A.V. Club, A.A. Dowd called the film a "sadness pile that confuses nonstop hardship for drama, begging for our tears at every moment". IndieWire critic David Ehrlich also wrote a mixed review, calling it "an astonishing work of social-realism that's diluted (and ultimately defeated) by an array of severe miscalculations".

Accolades
The film was selected as the Lebanese entry for Best Foreign Language Film at the 91st Academy Awards. It made the December shortlist in 2018, before being nominated for the Academy Award in January 2019.

See also
 List of submissions to the 91st Academy Awards for Best Foreign Language Film
 List of Lebanese submissions for the Academy Award for Best Foreign Language Film

Notes
  Kafarnāḥūm, also known as Cafarnaúm or Capharnaüm. Capernaum was a village in the Galilee region in the territory of Israel; it was condemned by Jesus as one of the three settlements that refused to repent for its sins even after he performed miracles of healing there; in French, a capharnaüm is a place with a disorderly accumulation of objects; it is translated onscreen in this film as "Chaos."

References

External links
 
 
 

2018 films
2018 drama films
Lebanese drama films
2010s Arabic-language films
Courtroom films
Films about poverty
Films about refugees
Films set in Lebanon
Films about child abuse
Sony Pictures Classics films